State Highway 29B (RJ SH 29B, SH-29B) is a State Highway in Rajasthan state of India that connects Bundi in Bundi district of Rajasthan with Nainwa in Bundi district of Rajasthan. The total length of RJ SH 29B is 44.00 km.

References

Highways in India
Roads in Rajasthan